Neuronal calcium sensor-1 (NCS-1) also known as frequenin homolog (Drosophila) (freq) is a protein that  is encoded by the FREQ gene in humans. NCS-1 is a member of the neuronal calcium sensor family, a class of EF hand containing calcium-myristoyl-switch proteins.

Function 

NCS-1 regulates synaptic transmission, helps control the dynamics of nerve terminal growth,  is critical for some forms of learning and memory in C. elegans and mammals, regulates corticohippocampal plasticity; and enhancing levels of NCS-1 in the mouse dentate gyrus increases spontaneous exploration of safe environments, potentially linking NCS-1 to curiosity.

NCS-1 is a calcium sensor, not a calcium buffer (chelator); thus it is a high-affinity, low-capacity, calcium-binding protein.

Frq can substitute for calmodulin in some situations. It is thought to be associated with neuronal secretory vesicles and regulate neurosecretion.
 It is the Ca2+-sensing subunit of the yeast phosphatidylinositol (PtdIns)-4-OH kinase, PIK1
 It binds to many proteins, some in calcium dependent and some in calcium independent ways, and switches many of the targets "on" (some off).
 Calcineurin (protein phosphatase 2B)
 GRK2 (G-protein-coupled receptor kinase 2)
 D2 dopamine receptor
 IL1RAPL1 (interleukin-1 receptor accessory protein-like 1 protein)
 PI4KIIIβ (type III phosphatidylinositol 4-kinase β)
 IP3 receptor (this activity is inhibited by lithium - a drug used for the treatment of bipolar disorder)
 3',5'-cyclic nucleotide phosphodiesterases
 ARF1 (ADP Ribosylation factor 1)
 A type (Kv4.3; Shal-related subfamily, member 3) voltage-gated potassium channels
 Nitric oxide synthase
 TRPC5 channel
 Ric8a 
 Frq modulates Ca2+ entry through a functional interaction with the α1 voltage-gated Ca2+-channel subunit.

Structure 

NCS-1 is a globular protein consisting of ten alpha-helices. Four pairs of alpha-helices each form independent 12-amino-acid loops containing a negatively charged calcium binding domain known as an EF-hand. However, only three of these EF hands are functional (the most N-terminal EF-hand does not bind calcium). They could be occupied not only by calcium but also by magnesium and zinc ions. NCS-1 also contains at least two known protein binding domains, and a large surface exposed hydrophobic crevice containing EF-hands three and four. There is a myristoylation motif at the N-terminus that presumably allows NCS-1 to associate with lipid membranes.

Clinical significance 

The expression of  NCS-1 increases in bipolar disorder and some forms of schizophrenia and decreases in inflammatory bowel disease. NCS-1 has also been linked with Autism.  In addition NCS-1 is significant in intelligence in creating curiosity by its function on dopamine D2 receptors in the dentate gyrus, increasing memory for complex tasks. http://www.physorg.com/news172174436.html

History 

NCS-1 was originally discovered in Drosophila as a gain-of-function mutation associated with frequency-dependent increases in neurotransmission. A role in neurotransmission was later confirmed in Drosophila using frq null mutants. Work in bovine chromaffin cells demonstrated that NCS-1 is also a modulator of neurotransmission in mammals. The designation 'NCS-1' came from the assumption that the protein was expressed only in neuronal cell types, which is not the case.

References

Further reading

External links 
Signaling_gateway
NCS proteins

Proteins
Biology of bipolar disorder